Giunti Editore S.p.A. is an Italian publishing house founded in Florence in 1956. The company is based in Villa La Loggia, in via Bolognese, and affiliated offices in Milan. Giunti S.p.A. is the leader of a group comprising various brands and that is placed at second place among the Italian publishing groups by turnover.

History 
In the thirties of the twentieth century, Renato Giunti began to collaborate with the Florentine publishing house R. Bemporad & son, representing one of the partners. He later became general manager.

After the Second World War Renato Giunti took over the company, to which he gave the name "Bemporad Marzocco". In 1956 he became owner and managing director.

In 1960 it acquired the Florentine publishing house Barbèra, which had started its activity in 1855. In 1965 all the acquired publishing houses were brought together in the Giunti Publishing Consortium. In 1975, Sergio Giunti, a Renato'son, succeeded his father as head of the Consortium.

Until the mid-eighties, Giunti edited a few magazines, including: "La Vita Scholastica" (born in 1947) and "Contemporary Psychology", which appeared in 1974. In 1986 Sergio Giunti started an important publishing project in the magazine sector launching on market, six monthly cultural magazines: "Art and Dossier", "History and Dossier", "Medicine and Dossier", "Music and Dossier", "Science and Dossier", to which "Archeologia Viva" is added, all with innovative formula of the magazine with a monographic dossier at the center.

In 1990 the Giunti Publishing Group (in itaian: Gruppo Editoriale Giunti S.p.A.)  was born, in which the publishing houses and the various publishing brands acquired converged. In the new decade, the group entered the multimedia sector: "Giunti Multimedia" was created. In 2002, all the multimedia activities of Giunti Multimedia and Giunti Ricerca were merged into "Giunti Labs".

In 2003 Giunti Gruppo Editoriale S.p.A. changes its name to Giunti Editore S.p.A.

In 2014, the publishing company reached an agreement with Disney Italia. Giunti becomes the editor of some publishing products, both paper and digital, with the Disney Books brand and the paper publishing products under the Marvel and Lucasfilm brand.

In autumn 2016, the Bompiani publishing house, sold by Mondadori for €16.5 million, became part of the group, under the guidance of editor-in-chief Beatrice Masini.

Currently the publishing group consists of a group of about 20 companies operating in all fields of the book sector, including the ebook market.

History of denominations 

 Marzocco, from 17 October 1938 to 1959;
 Bemporad-Marzocco, dal 25 June 1959 to 1974;
 Giunti-Marzocco S.p.A., dal 20 December 1974 to 1990;
 Gruppo Editoriale Giunti S.p.A., from 1990 to 2003;
 Giunti Editore S.p.A., dal 2003 – nowadays.

Main group companies 

 Giunti Editore SpA;
 Giunti al Punto SpA;
 Giunti Industrie Grafiche SpA;
 Giunti Distribuzione SpA;
 Giunti Scuola Srl;
 Giunti Psychometrics Srl;
 Dami Editore Srl;
 De Vecchi Editore (from 2009);
 Disney Italia libri (from 2014);
 Bompiani (from 2016).

Giunti Bookstores 
The Giunti group also includes the "Giunti al Punto" chain of retail outlets, which with over 225 stores (in 2018) is the leading Italian bookstore chain in terms of number of stores. These are typically medium-sized outlets.

Authors 
Among the main authors published by Giunti Editore can be mentioned Lucinda Riley, Corina Bomann, Antonio Fusco, Roberto Baiocchi.

References

External links 

 

Publishing companies of Italy